Anil Kapoor is an Indian actor and producer and has appeared in more than 100 Hindi films, as well as international films and television series. His career has spanned almost 40 years as an actor, and as a producer since 2005.

Kapoor was born in Mumbai to film producer Surinder Kapoor and appeared in his first film with a small role in the Umesh Mehra's romance Hamare Tumhare (1979). He made his debut film and then starred as a lead actor in the 1980 Telugu film, Vamsa Vruksham directed by Bapu. He was supposed to be launched in Hindi with Kahan Kahan Se Guzar Gaya, but the film was delayed. He then made his Kannada film debut with Mani Ratnam's Pallavi Anu Pallavi (1983). Anil Kapoor got recognition for his lead role in film " Woh Saat Din" as Prem Partap Patiaale Waale in 1983. He received his first Filmfare Award, in the Best Supporting Actor category, for his role in Yash Chopra's Mashaal (1984). Kapoor earned his first Filmfare Best Actor Award for his performance in N. Chandra's Tezaab (1988) and another for his performance in Indra Kumar's Beta (1992). Kapoor subsequently starred in many other critically and commercially successful films, including Meri Jung (1985), Karma (1986), Janbaaz (1986), Aap Ke Saath (1986), Mr. India (1987), Ghar Ho To Aisa (1990), Awaargi (1990), Benaam Badsha (1991), and Virasat (1997), for which he won the Filmfare Critics Award for Best Actor; Taal (1999), for which he won his second Filmfare Best Supporting Actor Award; Pukar (2000), which earned him a National Film Award for Best Actor; No Entry (2005) and Dil Dhadakne Do (2015) for which he won his third Filmfare Best Supporting Actor Award. Kapoor has starred in more than a 100 films.

Kapoor's first role in an international film was in Danny Boyle's Academy Award-winning film Slumdog Millionaire, for which he shared the Screen Actors Guild Award for Outstanding Performance by a Cast in a Motion Picture. His performance in the eighth season of the action series 24 generated rave reviews from the American press. Globally, Kapoor is one of the most recognized Indian film actors.

Films

As actor

As producer
Anil Kapoor produces the films under the banner Anil Kapoor Films & Communication Network.

Television

References

External links
 Anil Kapoor filmography on IMDb

Indian filmographies
Male actor filmographies
Filmography